Aleš Križan (born 25 July 1971) is a retired Slovenian football defender.

Križan most notably played in England for Barnsley having joined from Maribor. He played in the 1997–98 Premier League with the South Yorkshire club, appearing in 12 matches as a starter. However, they were relegated after that season and he only played one more league game in the next two seasons for Barnsley after John Hendrie became the manager and also after breaking a leg at the beginning of season. He left the team in 2000, shortly after his teammates lost the playoff final to Ipswich Town.

After retiring from professional football, he played amateur football in Austria for SV Wildon and USV Mettersdorf.

Križan was capped 25 times for the Slovenian national team between 1993 and 1998.

References

External links 

 NZS profile 

1971 births
Living people
Sportspeople from Maribor
Yugoslav footballers
Slovenian footballers
Association football fullbacks
NK Rudar Velenje players
NK Maribor players
Barnsley F.C. players
NK Korotan Prevalje players
Slovenian PrvaLiga players
Premier League players
English Football League players
Slovenian expatriate footballers
Expatriate footballers in England
Slovenian expatriate sportspeople in England
Expatriate footballers in Austria
Slovenian expatriate sportspeople in Austria
Slovenia international footballers